Kha with stroke (Ӿ ӿ; italics: Ӿ ӿ) is a letter of the Cyrillic script. In Unicode, this letter is called "Ha with stroke". Its form is derived from the Cyrillic letter Kha (Х х Х х).

Computing codes

See also 
Һ һ : Cyrillic letter Shha
Cyrillic characters in Unicode
Х х : Cyrillic letter Kha

References

Cyrillic letters with diacritics
Letters with stroke